This is a list of literature pages categorized by country, language, or cultural group. Sometimes these literatures will be called national literatures because they help define a national identity or provide a common reference point for that country's culture. 

Other
Western literature

 

 
Literature lists
Literature by language